This is a list of notable people who were born or have lived in Reykjavík, Iceland.

Born in Reykjavík

19th century 

 Jóhann Gunnar Sigurðsson (1882–1906), poet
 Sigurjón Pétursson (1888–1955), wrestler
 Tryggvi Þórhallsson (1889–1935), Prime Minister of Iceland from 1927 to 1932
 Jóhannes Gunnarsson (1897–1972), prelate of the Roman Catholic Church
 Engel Lund (1900–1996), Danish-Icelandic soprano

20th century

1901–1940 

 Ólafía Einarsdóttir (1924-2017), first Icelander to earn a degree in archaeology
 Margrét Þorbjörg Thors Hallgrímsson (1902–1996), matriarch of one of the most powerful families in Iceland in the twentieth century
 Halldór Laxness (1902–1998), writer
 Bjarni Benediktsson (1908–1970), leader in the independence movement in Iceland
 Gunnar Thoroddsen (1910–1983), Prime Minister of Iceland from 1980 to 1983
 Baldur Möller (1914–1999), chess master
 Áskell Löve (1916–1994), botanist
 Louisa Matthíasdóttir (1917–2000), Icelandic-American painter
 Jórunn Viðar (1918–2017), pianist and composer
 Þorbjörg Pálsdóttir (1919–2009), sculptor
 Drífa Viðar (1920–1971), writer, artist and educator
 Albert Guðmundsson (1923–1994), first Icelandic professional football player
 Geir Hallgrímsson (1925–1990), Prime Minister of Iceland (1974–1978) and mayor of Reykjavík (1959–1972)
 Haukur Clausen (1928–2003), Olympic athlete
 Örn Clausen (1928–2008), athlete
 Steingrímur Hermannsson (1928–2010), politician
 Magnus Magnusson (1929–2007), journalist, translator, writer and television presenter
 Vigdís Finnbogadóttir (born 1930), President of Iceland from 1980 to 1996
 Margrét Þóra Hallgrímsson (born 1930), wife of the businessman Björgólfur Guðmundsson
 Jón Gunnar Árnason (1931–1989), sculptor
 Friðrik Ólafsson (born 1935), chess grandmaster
 Jón Kristinsson (born 1936), Dutch architect
 Álfrún Gunnlaugsdóttir (born 1938), writer
 Atli Heimir Sveinsson (born 1938), composer

1941–1950 

 Björgólfur Guðmundsson (born 1941), chairman and former owner of West Ham United FC
 María Guðmundsdóttir (born 1942), filmmaker, photographer and actress
 Jóhanna Sigurðardóttir (born 1942), politician
 Markús Örn Antonsson (born 1943), Mayor of Reykjavík from 1991 to 1994
 Friðrik Klemenz Sophusson (born 1943), politician and company director
 Björn Bjarnason (born 1944), politician
 Pétur Blöndal (1944–2015), politician
 Gunnar Kvaran (born 1944), cellist
 Guðmundur Gunnarsson (born 1945), electrician and union leader
 Einar Hákonarson (born 1945), artist
 Bjarni Tryggvason (1945–2022), Canadian engineer and astronaut
 Jakob Yngvason (born 1945), physicist
 Ágúst Guðmundsson (born 1947), film director and screenwriter
 Gunnar Hansen (1947–2015), Icelandic-American actor
 Þórður Helgason (born 1947), writer and educationalist
 Ólafur Haukur Símonarson (born 1947), playwright and novelist
 Karl Sigurbjörnsson (born 1947), Lutheran bishop of Iceland
 Guðmundur Sigurjónsson (born 1947), chess grandmaster
 Þuríður Backman (born 1948), politician
 Anna Svanhildur Björnsdóttir (born 1948), writer and educator
 Elmar Geirsson (born 1948), footballer
 Ari Trausti Guðmundsson (born 1948), geologist, author, documentarian, broadcaster, journalist, mountaineer and explorer
 Ólafur Gunnarsson (born 1948), author and translator
 Hrafn Gunnlaugsson (born 1948), film director
 Ögmundur Jónasson (born 1948), politician
 Davíð Oddsson (born 1948), politician and the longest-serving Prime Minister of Iceland
 Ásta Ragnheiður Jóhannesdóttir (born 1949), politician
 Þórarinn Eldjárn (born 1949), writer
 Ágústína Jónsdóttir (born 1949), writer, artist and educator
 Kristenn Einarsson (born 1950), Icelandic-Norwegian publisher
 Steinunn Sigurðardóttir (born 1950), poet and novelist
 Árni Þórarinsson (born 1950), writer

1951–1960 

 Sturla Gunnarsson (born 1951), Canadian film director
 Geir Haarde (born 1951), politician
 Jónína Bjartmarz (born 1952), politician
 Edda Björgvinsdóttir (born 1952), actress, comedian, writer, director and motivational speaker
 Sigurjón Sighvatsson (born 1952), film producer and businessman
 Herbert Guðmundsson (born 1953), pop music singer-songwriter
 Össur Skarphéðinsson (born 1953), politician
 Friðrik Þór Friðriksson (born 1954), film director
 Ingibjörg Sólrún Gísladóttir (born 1954), politician
 Einar Már Guðmundsson (born 1954), author of novels, short stories and poetry
 Jónína Leósdóttir (born 1954), novelist, playwright
 Logi Ólafsson (born 1954), football coach
 Kolbrún Halldórsdóttir (born 1955), politician
 Einar Kárason (born 1955), writer
 Jón Gunnarsson (born 1956), politician
 Bubbi Morthens (born 1956), singer and songwriter
 Helgi Ólafsson (born 1956), chess grandmaster
 Halldór Guðmundsson (born 1956), author
 Atli Eðvaldsson (born 1957), footballer
 Sigurður Gylfi Magnússon (born 1957), historian
 Páll Guðlaugsson (born 1958), footballer and football coach
 Jóhannes Helgason (born 1958), guitar player
 Hilmar Örn Hilmarsson (born 1958), musician
 Elísabet Jökulsdóttir (born 1958), author and journalist
 Árni Mathiesen (born 1958), politician
 Auður Ava Ólafsdóttir (born 1958), professor of art history, novelist, playwright and poet
 Kjartan Ólafsson (born 1958), musicologist, composer
 Eiríkur Hauksson (born 1959), heavy metal vocalist
 Hallgrímur Helgason (born 1959), painter, novelist, translator and columnist
 Æsa Sigurjónsdóttir (born 1959), art curator
 Jón Loftur Árnason (born 1960), chess grandmaster
 Jón Atli Benediktsson (born 1960), President of the Governing Council and Rector of the University of Iceland
 Sigurður Einarsson (born 1960), economist, businessman
 Guðmundur Guðmundsson (born 1960), handball player
 Margeir Pétursson (born 1960), banker and chess grandmaster
 Hannes Sigurðsson (born 1960), art historian

1961–1965 

 Arnaldur Indriðason (born 1961), writer of crime fiction
 Gyrðir Elíasson (born 1961), author and translator
 Arnór Guðjohnsen (born 1961), footballer
 Lárus Guðmundsson (born 1961), footballer
 Einar Örn Benediktsson (born 1962), singer
 Ólafía Hrönn Jónsdóttir (born 1962), actress
 Bragi Ólafsson (born 1962), musician and writer
 Ólafur Jóhann Ólafsson (born 1962), businessman, writer and scientist
 Kristín Ómarsdóttir (born 1962), poet and writer
 Ásbjörn Óttarsson (born 1962), politician
 Sjón (born 1962), poet, novelist and lyricist
 Kristín Helga Gunnarsdóttir (born 1963), children's writer, columnist and novelist
 Logi Gunnarsson (born 1963), philosopher
 Jóhann Hjartarson (born 1963), chess grandmaster
 Óskar Jónasson (born 1963), film director and screenwriter
 Þorsteinn M. Jónsson (born 1963), businessman
 Ingvar Eggert Sigurðsson (born 1963), actor
 Jón Kalman Stefánsson (born 1963), author
 Halla Margrét Árnadóttir (born 1964), singer
 Snorri Magnússon (born 1964), the head of the Icelandic Association of Police Officers
 Magnús Scheving (born 1964), writer, entrepreneur, producer, actor and athlete
 Bjarni Bjarnason (born 1965), writer
 Björk (born 1965), singer, songwriter, actress, record producer and DJ
 Þorgerður Katrín Gunnarsdóttir (born 1965), politician
 Steinunn Valdís Óskarsdóttir (born 1965), politician and mayor of Reykjavík from 2004 to 2006
 María Sólrún Sigurðardóttir (born 1965), German film director
 Þórunn Sveinbjarnardóttir (born 1965), politician

1966–1970 
 Ragna Árnadóttir (born 1966), lawyer and politician
 Árni Páll Árnason (born 1966), politician
 Eagle Egilsson (born 1966), television director and cinematographer
 Hilmar Jensson (born 1966), guitarist
 Baltasar Kormákur (born 1966), actor, theater and film director
 Ólöf Nordal (1966–2017), politician
 Skúli Sverrisson (born 1966), composer and bass guitarist
 Björgólfur Thor Björgólfsson (born 1967), businessman and entrepreneur
 Jón Gnarr (born 1967), actor, comedian and politician
 Helgi Hjörvar (born 1967), politician
 Áslaug Magnúsdóttir (born 1967), business woman and entrepreneur
 Guðlaugur Þór Þórðarson (born 1967), politician
 Katrín Sigurdardóttir (born 1967), artist
 Jon Stephenson von Tetzchner (born 1967), programmer and businessman
 Guðni Th. Jóhannesson (born 1968), President of Iceland since 2016
 Hermann Stefánsson (born 1968), writer, musician and poet
 Halla Tómasdóttir (born 1968), business person and public speaker
 Ármann Þorvaldsson (born 1968), UK CEO of Kaupthing Bank
 Hilmir Snær Guðnason (born 1969), actor and voice actor
 Jóhann Jóhannsson (born 1969), composer
 Rúnar Kristinsson (born 1969), footballer
 Ásta Kristjana Sveinsdóttir (born 1969), philosopher
 Steinunn Ólína Þorsteinsdóttir (born 1969), actress, TV show host, producer and writer
 Bjarni Benediktsson (born 1970), politician
 Gerður Kristný (born 1970), poet
 Anna Mjöll (born 1970), jazz singer and songwriter
 Paul Oscar (born 1970), pop singer, songwriter and disc jockey

1971–1975 

 Ragnar Bragason (born 1971), film director, screenwriter and producer
 Gabríela Friðriksdóttir (born 1971), artist and sculptor
 Helgi Kolviðsson (born 1971), footballer
 Ragnheiður Melsteð (born 1971), executive producer and co-founder of LazyTown Entertainment
 Hera Björk (born 1972), singer
 Arnar Grétarsson (born 1972), football manager and former professional football player
 Guðjón Már Guðjónsson (born 1972), entrepreneur and the CEO of OZ
 Eygló Harðardóttir (born 1972), politician
 Gunnhildur Hauksdóttir (born 1972), visual artist
 Jón Atli Jónasson (born 1972), playwright and screenwriter
 Steinunn Kristín Þórðardóttir (born 1972), businesswoman
 Róbert Ingi Douglas (born 1973), film director, screenwriter and cinematographer
 Gísli Örn Garðarsson (born 1973), actor and director
 Judith Ingolfsson (born 1973), violinist
 Auður Jónsdóttir (born 1973), author
 Andri Snær Magnason (born 1973), writer
 Dagur Sigurðsson (born 1973), handball player
 Ólafur Stefánsson (born 1973), handball player
 Selma Björnsdóttir (born 1974), actress and singer
 Garðar Thór Cortes (born 1974), tenor
 Nína Dögg Filippusdóttir (born 1974), actress and producer
 Katrin Fridriks (born 1974), abstract painter
 Kristján Helgason (born 1974), snooker player
 Hermann Hreiðarsson (born 1974), footballer
 Katrín Júlíusdóttir (born 1974), politician
 Guðmundur Þór Kárason (born 1974), puppet designer and puppeteer
 Helgi Sigurðsson (born 1974), footballer
 Mikael Torfason (born 1974), writer
 Árni Gautur Arason (born 1975), football goalkeeper
 Heimir Björgúlfsson (born 1975), artist
 Brynjar Gunnarsson (born 1975), footballer
 Sigmundur Davíð Gunnlaugsson (born 1975), politician
 Gunnleifur Gunnleifsson (born 1975), football goalkeeper
 Ófeigur Sigurðsson (born 1975), poet, novelist and translator
 Sigfús Sigurðsson (born 1975), handball player
 Héðinn Steingrímsson (born 1975), chess grandmaster
 Thóra Arnórsdóttir (born 1975), media personality

1976–1980 

 Kalli Bjarni (born 1976), singer
 Bryndís Haraldsdóttir (born 1976), politician
 Katrín Jakobsdóttir (born 1976), politician
 Ragnar Kjartansson (born 1976), artist
 Guðrún Eva Mínervudóttir (born 1976), writer
 Björgvin Franz Gíslason (born 1977), actor, entertainer and children's television host
 Gylfi Gylfason (born 1977), handball player
 Haraldur Þorvarðarson (born 1977), handball player
 Ívar Ingimarsson (born 1977), footballer
 Hössi Ólafsson (born 1977), singer, rapper, producer, writer and actor
 Regína Ósk (born 1977), singer
 Snorri Snorrason (born 1977), singer
 Svala (born 1977), singer and songwriter
 Guðlaugur Arnarsson (born 1978), handball player
 Gylfi Einarsson (born 1978), football player
 Vala Flosadóttir (born 1978), athlete
 Eiður Guðjohnsen (born 1978), footballer
 Rökkvi Vésteinsson (born 1978), comedian
 Arnar Viðarsson (born 1978), footballer
 Jóhannes Ásbjörnsson (born 1979), TV and radio show host
 Guðjón Valur Sigurðsson (born 1979), handball player
 Andri Steinn (born 1979), film editor
 Ólöf Arnalds (born 1980), singer/songwriter
 Sturla Ásgeirsson (born 1980), handball player
 Baldur Bett (born 1980), footballer
 Róbert Gunnarsson (born 1980), handball player
 Veigar Páll Gunnarsson (born 1980), football striker
 Ingimundur Ingimundarson (born 1980), handball player
 Vignir Svavarsson (born 1980), handball player

1981–1985 

 Örn Arnarson (born 1981), swimmer
 Snorri Guðjónsson (born 1981), handball player
 Indriði Sigurðsson (born 1981), football defender
 Anita Briem (born 1982), actress
 Ásmundur Einar Daðason (born 1982), politician
 Hildur Vala Einarsdóttir (born 1982), singer
 Logi Geirsson (born 1982), handballer
Hildur Guðnadóttir (born 1982), Academy Award-winning composer
 Guðmundur Steinn Gunnarsson (born 1982), composer
 Ágústa Eva Erlendsdóttir (born 1982), singer and actress
 Stefan Kristjansson (born 1982), chess grandmaster
 Jón Arnór Stefánsson (born 1982), basketball player
 Halla Vilhjálmsdóttir (born 1982), television, film actress and singer
 Hera Hjartardóttir (born 1983), singer-songwriter
 Ragna Ingólfsdóttir (born 1983), badminton player
 Hannes Sigurðsson (born 1983), football striker
 Ólafur Ingi Skúlason (born 1983), footballer
 Hannes Þór Halldórsson (born 1984), footballer
 Þórunn Helga Jónsdóttir (born 1984), footballer
 Ýmir Vigfússon (born 1984), hacker and computer security expert
 Unnur Birna Vilhjálmsdóttir (born 1984), actress, lawyer, model and beauty queen
 Ásgeir Örn Hallgrímsson (born 1984), handball player
 Hólmfríður Magnúsdóttir (born 1984), footballer
 Sölvi Ottesen (born 1984), footballer
 Birkir Már Sævarsson (born 1984), footballer
 Sunna Davíðsdóttir (born 1985), mixed martial artist
 Ásdís Hjálmsdóttir (born 1985), javelin thrower
 Þorgerður Ólafsdóttir (born 1985), visual artist

1986–1990 

 Helgi Þór Arason (born 1986), pop singer
 Freyja Haraldsdóttir (born 1986), politician
 Jóhanna Vala Jónsdóttir (born 1986), Miss Iceland 2007
 Ragnar Sigurðsson (born 1986), footballer
 Guðjón Baldvinsson (born 1986), footballer
 Theódór Elmar Bjarnason (born 1987), footballer
 Guðmundur Jörundsson (born 1987), fashion designer
 Ari Freyr Skúlason (born 1987), football player
 Sævar Birgisson (born 1988), cross-country skier
 Hafþór Júlíus Björnsson (born 1988), strongman, actor and former basketball player
 Salka Sól Eyfeld (born 1988), singer, actress, radio host and TV-presenter
 Rúrik Gíslason (born 1988), footballer
 Bjarki Már Gunnarsson (born 1988), handball player
 Eggert Jónsson (born 1988), footballer
 Rúnar Kárason (born 1988), handball player
 Heida Reed (born 1988), actress and model
 Bjarni Viðarsson (born 1988), footballer
 Alfreð Finnbogason (born 1989), footballer
 Alexandra Ívarsdóttir (born 1989), beauty pageant contestant; Miss Iceland 2008
 Ögmundur Kristinsson (born 1989), football goalkeeper
 Baltasar Breki Samper (born 1989), actor
 Gylfi Sigurðsson (born 1989), footballer
 Valgerður Þóroddsdóttir (born 1989), poet and literary curator
 Bjarki Már Elísson (born 1990), handball player
 Jóhann Berg Guðmundsson (born 1990), footballer
 Kolbeinn Sigþórsson (born 1990), footballer
 Kristinn Steindórsson (born 1990), footballer

1991–2010 

 Helga Margrét Þorsteinsdóttir (born 1991), heptathlete
 Sigurdur Thordarson (born 1992), whistleblower
 Hjörvar Steinn Grétarsson (born 1993), chess grandmaster
 Hörður Björgvin Magnússon (born 1993), footballer
 Aron Elís Þrándarson (born 1994), footballer
 Eygló Ósk Gústafsdóttir (born 1995), swimmer
 Hjörtur Hermannsson (born 1995), footballer
 Elín Metta Jensen (born 1995), footballer
 Aníta Hinriksdóttir (born 1996), middle-distance track athlete
 Ari Ólafsson (born 1998), singer

Lived in Reykjavík 
 Einar Sveinsson (1906–1973), City Architect of Reykjavík between 1934–1973
 Nína Björk Árnadóttir (1941–2000), playwright, poet and novelist
 Árni Sigfússon (born 1956), former mayor of Reykjavík (1994)
 Svandís Svavarsdóttir (born 1964), member of the Icelandic parliament
 Disa Eythorsdottir (born 1965), Iceland-born American bridge player
 Bjarni Haukur Thorsson (born 1971), director, writer, producer and actor
 Alex Somers (born 1984), American visual artist and musician
 Gunnar Nelson (born 1988), Icelandic MMA fighter

References

Reykjavík